Lawrence H. "Larry" Lee, Jr. (March 7, 1943 – October 30, 2007) was an American guitarist and singer-songwriter from Memphis, Tennessee, best known for his work with Al Green and Jimi Hendrix.

Gypsy Sun and Rainbows
Lee was an old friend of Jimi Hendrix and Billy Cox.  They had all played together in various R&B acts, and in 1969 Lee joined Hendrix's new band Gypsy Sun and Rainbows as rhythm guitarist, occasionally playing alternating lead. The newly formed band was hired to play the Woodstock Music Festival for which Hendrix had been previously booked to play as the Jimi Hendrix Experience. Lee had been back from the Vietnam war for only two weeks, was unemployed when Hendrix called him and had joined Gypsy Sun and Rainbows only a week before the Woodstock concert.

At the concert Hendrix and Lee both wore white outfits, and exotic headgear was much in evidence. Lee wore a distinctive green bandana that had long tassels hanging over his eyes, which at the time he thought was a statement of originality as he explains in the Woodstock DVD, whereas Billy Cox wore a multi-coloured turban and Hendrix a bright pink bandana and large shining ear studs. Lee played a 1955 Gibson Les Paul Custom guitar and sang his own composition "Master Mind" as well as two Impressions numbers sung as a medley - "Gypsy Woman" and "Aware of Love", with Hendrix playing Curtis Mayfield style back up.  Lee also took several solos and played some alternating lead ("weaving") with Hendrix. Although all the songs he sang lead on at Woodstock were recorded, the Hendrix estate owns the rights to them and has thus far prohibited their release.

After Woodstock these "hired guns" briefly continued to help Hendrix develop his new style, which included the first of his classic, new "message" songs, in which Hendrix attempted to communicate his complex philosophy towards the current Vietnam war and human relationships in general: Machine Gun, Message to Love and Izabella. This group then played at the Harlem "United Block" benefit and later performed at the small "Salvation" club in Greenwich Village to a mixed reception. Lee, Velez and Sultan then went off to pursue their briefly interrupted careers.  Sultan later played occasional sessions for Hendrix.

Al Green years
During the 1970s, Lee acted as the band director and lead guitarist for Al Green's touring band.  He appeared on The Tonight Show Starring Johnny Carson and television specials around the world with Green.  Lee also was a songwriter and wrote for Stax Records early recording artists, the Astors. "Judy", a song he wrote during his days playing with Hendrix in Nashville was covered by Al Green and the Spidells.  Lee briefly traveled with blues great Albert King. He said King fired him because his playing overshadowed King's.

In the 1980s and 90s, Lee teamed with his friend, El Espada, Timothy Lee Matthews, and they collaborated on Matthews' CD Songs for the Greats.  Matthews, co-writer of the classic blues song, "Breaking Up Somebody's Home", called Lee the consummate sideman. Lee's distinctive complementary rhythm and lead style can be heard on nine of the eleven songs on Matthews' CD.

Larry Lee lived in Memphis, Tennessee and played in the regional rock/blues/R&B outfit Elmo and the Shades. Lee was a member of Elmo and the Shades for eight years and was an integral part of their success during this period. The band enjoyed much popularity during this time playing nightclubs, casinos, parties, and occasional blues festivals throughout Memphis and the Mid-South.   Lee is featured on three cuts on the new CD (2009) by Elmo and The Shades, Blue Memphis. They are "Same Old Dog", "I Get the Blues for Free", and the title cut "Blue Memphis". Lee took his leave from the group in August 2006 as his battle with cancer left him too weak to perform. Larry was as soulful a blues singer and incredibly moving blues guitarist as Memphis, Beale St. and the world has ever seen.

Lee also joined in with Mike Strickland and the Usual Unusual Clowns at random intervals.

Death

Larry Lee died in Memphis, Tennessee on October 29, 2007 after a year battling stomach cancer, and was buried at 11 a.m. on November 6 in West Tennessee Veterans Cemetery. He left wife Carrie Lee, daughter April D. Lee and three sons - Lawrence H. Lee III, Robert A. Lee, and Thomas Lee. He was also survived by his mother, Lula Lee, and five grandchildren.

Selective discography
with Jimi Hendrix
Nine to the Universe (1980)
Woodstock (1994)
Live at Woodstock (1999)

with Al Green
I'll Rise Again (1983)

with Timothy Lee Matthews
Songs For The Greats (1998) ft. on track 4 "What Did She Say"

with Elmo and the Shades
Blue Memphis (2009)

References

1943 births
2007 deaths
African-American guitarists
American rock guitarists
American male guitarists
Deaths from stomach cancer
Musicians from Memphis, Tennessee
20th-century American guitarists
Guitarists from Tennessee
20th-century American male musicians
Gypsy Sun and Rainbows members
Deaths from cancer in Tennessee
20th-century African-American musicians
21st-century African-American people